1997 Belarusian First League was the seventh season of 2nd level football championship in Belarus. It started in April and ended in November 1997.

Team changes from 1996 season
Two best teams of 1996 Belarusian First League (Transmash Mogilev and Kommunalnik Slonim) were promoted to Belarusian Premier League. They were replaced by two lowest-placed teams of 1996 Premier League (Obuvshchik Lida and Vedrich Rechitsa).

No teams relegated to lower level by league position due to required league expansion back to 16 clubs. Three clubs were initially promoted from the Second League (BATE Borisov and Veino Mogilev Raion as the winners of their respective groups, and Dnepr Rogachev as a winner of additional play-offs between group runners-up).

FC Kobrin withdrew from the league to amateur level during off-season due to financial troubles and were replaced by Beloozyorsk (who previously lost promotion play-offs against Dnepr Rogachev).

Before the start of the season Obuvshchik Lida were renamed to FC Lida, Vedrich Rechitsa updated their name to Vedrich-97 Rechitsa, Kommunalnik Pinsk were renamed to Pinsk-900, Khimik Svetlogorsk to Kommunalnik Svetlogorsk, Stroitel Bereza to FC Bereza and newcomers FC Beloozyorsk to Belenergostroy Beloozyorsk.

Overview
Two best teams of the season (Gomel and BATE Borisov) were promoted to the Premier League. Two lowest placed teams (Lokomotiv Vitebsk and Stroitel Starye Dorogi were relegated to the Second League.

Teams and locations

League table

Top goalscorers

See also
1997 Belarusian Premier League
1996–97 Belarusian Cup
1997–98 Belarusian Cup

External links
RSSSF

Belarusian First League seasons
2
Belarus
Belarus